The women's event of the 2016 World Allround Speed Skating Championships was held on 5 and 6 March 2016.

Results

500 m
The race was started at 12:58.

3000 m
The race was started at 16:06.

1500 m
The race was started at 14:24.

5000 m
The race was started at 16:44.

Final standings
After all events.

References

Women
World